The following lists events that happened during 1985 in New Zealand.

Population
 Estimated population as of 31 December: 3,303,100
 Increase since 31 December 1984: 10,100 (0.31%)
 Males per 100 Females: 98.2

Incumbents

Regal and viceregal
Head of State – Elizabeth II
Governor-General – The Hon Sir David Beattie GCMG GCVO QSO QC followed by The Rt Revd. Sir Paul Reeves GCMG GCVO QSO

Government
The 41st New Zealand Parliament continued. The fourth Labour Party government was in power.

Speaker of the House – Basil Arthur then Gerard Wall
Prime Minister – David Lange
Deputy Prime Minister – Geoffrey Palmer
Minister of Finance – Roger Douglas
Minister of Foreign Affairs – David Lange
Chief Justice — Sir Ronald Davison

Parliamentary opposition
 Leader of the Opposition –  Jim McLay (National).

Main centre leaders
Mayor of Auckland – Catherine Tizard
Mayor of Hamilton – Ross Jansen
Mayor of Wellington – Ian Lawrence
Mayor of Christchurch – Hamish Hay
Mayor of Dunedin – Cliff Skeggs

Events
 4 February: Anti-nuclear policy leads to refusal of a visit by the American warship, the USS "Buchanan". Within days the United States cut military and intelligence ties with New Zealand and downgraded diplomatic relationships.
 First case of locally contracted AIDS is reported.
 Waitangi Tribunal given power to hear grievances arising since 1840.
4 March: New Zealand dollar floated.
15 June: A by-election in Timaru after the death of Labour MP Basil Arthur is won by Maurice McTigue for National.
10 July: two French secret agents blew up the Greenpeace flagship Rainbow Warrior in Auckland, killing crewmember Fernando Pereira. The Rainbow Warrior had been preparing to sail to Moruroa Atoll in the SE Pacific, to protest French nuclear weapons testing there.
 20 November Archbishop Paul Reeves appointed Governor General.

Arts and literature
 Keri Hulme wins Booker Prize for "The Bone People".
 Cilla McQueen wins the Robert Burns Fellowship.

See 1985 in art, 1985 in literature, :Category:1985 books

Music

New Zealand Music Awards
Winners are shown first with nominees underneath.
ALBUM OF THE YEAR  Netherworld Dancing Toys – Painted Years
Shona Laing – Genre
Herbs – Long Ago
SINGLE OF THE YEAR  Netherworld Dancing Toys – For Today
The Mockers – Forever Tuesday Morning
Peking Man – Lift Your Head Up High
BEST MALE VOCALIST  Andrew Fagan (The Mockers)
Malcolm Black (Netherworld Dancing Toys)
 Pat Urlich (Peking Man)
BEST FEMALE VOCALIST  Margaret Urlich
Patsy Riggir
Jacqui Fitzgerald
BEST GROUP  Netherworld Dancing Toys
The Mockers
Peking Man
MOST PROMISING MALE VOCALIST  Mark Loveys (Satellite Spies)
Paul Eversden (Katango)
James Gaylyn (Rise)
MOST PROMISING FEMALE VOCALIST  Debbie Harwood
Dianne Swann (Everything That Flies)
Betty Monga (IQU)
MOST PROMISING GROUP  Satellite Spies – Destiny in Motion
Everything That Flies – Bleeding Hearts
Katango – Dial L for Love
INTERNATIONAL ACHIEVEMENT  Dame Kiri Te Kanawa
DD Smash
Dalvanius Prime & The Patea Maori Club
BEST VIDEO  Fane Flaws – Diamonds on China (The Narcs)
Debra Bustin – Krazy Legs (The Pelicans)
Roger Guise – I Like To Drive (Scotty & Co)
BEST FILM SOUNDTRACK  Hammond Gamble / Beaver – Should I be good Should I Be Evil
Stephen McCurdy – Out in the Cold (Came A Hot Friday)
BEST PRODUCER  Nigel Stone – For Today
Glyn Tucker Jnr- Forever Tuesday Morning (The Mockers)
Graeme Myhre – Lift Your Head Up High (Peking Man)
BEST ENGINEER  Graeme Myhre – Lift Your Head Up High
Nigel Stone – For Today (Netherworld Dancing Toys)
Nigel Stone – Painted Years (Netherworld Dancing Toys)
BEST JAZZ ALBUM  Jacqui Fitzgerald – The Masquerade Is Over
Martin Winch – Sahara
Alan Broadbent Trio – Song of Home
BEST CLASSICAL ALBUM  Tamas Vasmas – Brahms
Dolce Consort – Recorder Music
National Youth Choir – Peter Godfrey Conducts the National Youth Choir of NZ
BEST COUNTRY ALBUM  Patsy Riggir – You Remind Me of a Love Song
Suzanne Prentice – I Wish I Was Waltzing With You
Richie Pickett & The Inlaws – Gone For Water
BEST FOLK ALBUM  Alan Young – That's No Way To Get Along
Martha Louise – The Sailor / Mixed Feelings
Mike Harding – Time on the Road
BEST GOSPEL ALBUM  Jules Riding – On This Night
Gray Bartlett – Two Shades of Gray
Wellington Salvation Army – Where Glory Dwelleth
POLYNESIAN ALBUM OF THE YEAR  Herbs – Long Ago
Aotearoa – Maranga Ake Ai
Howard Morrison – Songs of New Zealand
BEST COVER  Debra Bustin – Krazy Legs (The Pelicans)
Norman Te Whata & Emily Karaka – Long Ago (Herbs)
Paula Reid – State House Kid (Last Man Down)

See: 1985 in music

Performing arts

 Benny Award presented by the Variety Artists Club of New Zealand to Toni Savage BEM QSM.

Radio and television
The Broadcasting Tribunal awards the rights to broadcast a third channel to TV3.
Julian Mounter is appointed the TVNZ Director-General.
The Auckland Television Centre in Victoria Street, Auckland begins construction.  
15 May: British children's stop motion animated television series Postman Pat begins its screening debut on TV One.
1 June: TV ONE holds a three-and-a-half-hour special show to celebrate 25 years of New Zealand television.

See: 1985 in New Zealand television, 1985 in television, List of TVNZ television programming, :Category:Television in New Zealand, TV3 (New Zealand), :Category:New Zealand television shows, Public broadcasting in New Zealand

Films
Dangerous Orphans
Kingpin 
Leave All Fair
Mr Wrong
Shaker Run
Sylvia
The Lost Tribe
The Quiet Earth

See: :Category:1985 film awards, 1985 in film, List of New Zealand feature films, Cinema of New Zealand, :Category:1985 films

Sport

Athletics
John Campbell wins his first national title in the men's marathon, clocking 2:17:53 on 27 October in Hamilton, while Carol Raven does the same in the women's championship (2:53:26).

Horse racing

Harness racing
 New Zealand Trotting Cup: Borana
 Auckland Trotting Cup: Roydon Glen

Shooting
Ballinger Belt – Chester Burt (Ashhurst)

Soccer
 The Chatham Cup is won by Napier City Rovers who beat North Shore United 3–1 in the final.

Births
 25 January: Adam Campbell, Australian rules footballer.
 30 January: David Wikaira-Paul, actor.
 2 February: Jeff Whittington, murder victim.
 25 February: Benji Marshall, rugby league player.
 18 March (in Australia): Vince Lia, soccer player.
 10 April: Brad Wilson, cricketer.
 16 April: Daniel Flynn, cricketer.
 16 April: Brendon Leonard, rugby player.
 25 April: Olivia Wensley, lawyer.
 14 May: Sally Martin, actor.
 9 June: Richard Kahui, rugby player.
 19 June: Casey Williams, netball player.
 22 June: Thomas Leuluai, rugby league player.
 22 June: Frank Andrews, singer.
 27 June: Louis Anderson, rugby player.
 8 July: Ben Roberts, rugby league player.
 9 July: Bradley-John Watling, cricketer.
 13 July: Rachel Priest, cricketer.
 3 August: Sonny Bill Williams, rugby league player.
 28 September: Anton Devcich, cricketer.
 10 October: Bronson Harrison, rugby league player.
 16 October: Brent Findlay, cricketer.
 30 October: Kayla Sharland, field hockey striker.
 10 November: Elizabeth Ryan, field hockey striker.
 23 November: Stephen Brett, rugby union player.
 23 December: Emily Naylor, field hockey midfielder.
 Vicki Lin, television presenter.
:Category:1985 births

Deaths
 1 May: Sir Basil Arthur, politician and speaker of the House of Representatives (died in office).
 12 May: Sir Edward Sayers, parasitologist.
 7 July: Ewen Solon, actor.
 31 July: Murray Chapple, cricketer.
 16 October: Sir Bruce Levy, botanist. 
 16 December: William H. Pettit, missionary and evangelical church leader.
 31 December: Mal Matheson, cricketer.

See also
List of years in New Zealand
Timeline of New Zealand history
History of New Zealand
Military history of New Zealand
Timeline of the New Zealand environment
Timeline of New Zealand's links with Antarctica

References

 
New Zealand
Years of the 20th century in New Zealand
1980s in New Zealand